Skelton Névé is the immense névé of the Skelton Glacier, lying on the west side of the Royal Society Range. It was surveyed by New Zealand parties of the Commonwealth Trans-Antarctic Expedition (1956–58), who named it for its relationship to the Skelton Glacier.

References

Snow fields of the Ross Dependency
Hillary Coast
Névés of Antarctica